Krašnja is a village in the Municipality of Lukovica in the eastern part of the Upper Carniola region of Slovenia.

Church

The parish church in the settlement is dedicated to Saint Thomas.

References

External links

Krašnja on Geopedia

Populated places in the Municipality of Lukovica